Pilny or Pilný is a surname. Notable people with the surname include:

Bohuslav Pilný (born 1973), Czech footballer and manager
Ivan Pilný (born 1944), Czech politician
Otto Pilny (1866–1936), Swiss painter